Bobir Bahodir o'g'li Davlatov (born 1 March 1996) is an Uzbek professional footballer. He plays for Metallurg Bekabad.

Career

Club
In July 2015, Davlatov moved to FC Zhetysu with fellow Rubin Kazan teammates Mikhail Petrolay, Ruslan Galiakberov and Ilsur Samigullin.

After playing in the Rubin Kazan youth system, he joined FC Aktobe, where he was frequently in the starting lineup. In 13 appearances, he made 3 assists and scored one goal.

In 2017, he signed with the Russian team FC Neftekhimik Nizhnekamsk.

After playing back in Uzbekistan for 2 years, he returned to Neftekhimik on 28 August 2019.

International
Playing for the Uzbekistan U-17 side in 2011, he scored the opening goal in a 2-1 win over the United States.

Personal life
In 2014 Davlatov attempted unsuccessfully to acquire British citizenship.

He returned to his hometown of Yangiyer for a short time to take college tests.

References

External links
 

1996 births
Living people
Association football midfielders
FC Neftekhimik Nizhnekamsk players
FC Rubin Kazan players
FC Aktobe players
PFK Metallurg Bekabad players
Uzbekistani footballers
Uzbekistani expatriate footballers
Expatriate footballers in Russia
Uzbekistani expatriate sportspeople in Russia
People from Sirdaryo Region